Devusinh Jesingbhai Chauhan is an Indian politician and serving as  Minister of State for Communications of India. He is member of parliament to the 17th Lok Sabha from Kheda (Lok Sabha constituency), Gujarat. He won the 2014 Indian general election being a Bharatiya Janata Party candidate.

References

India MPs 2014–2019
Lok Sabha members from Gujarat
Living people
People from Kheda district
1964 births
Bharatiya Janata Party politicians from Gujarat
India MPs 2019–present